Roshan Pilapitiya Abhayasinghe (born 21 March 1975), is an actor in Sri Lankan cinema, theatre and television as well as a singer. Largely active in television serials, Pilapitiya was awarded the most popular actor award at Sumathi Tele Awards in 2003 and 2004.

Personal life
As the youngest of the four children, Roshan was born on 21 March 1975 in Hanguranketha, city near Kandy, Sri Lanka. His father is Ariya Abhayasinghe who was a tea plantation owner. His mother Mallika Pilapitiya is also a retired actress, where she recorded the first female lead role of Sri Lanka's first outdoor movie Rekava in 1956 directed by Lester James Peries. She died on 26 March 2022 at the age of 86.

His primary education is from C. C. College, Hanguranketha, and then he attended Dharmaraja College, Kandy for secondary education. He also performed well in college stage dramas. He was a bright student in the school, where he was a member of the best drama crew of the school in 1988, and also won the award for inter-school best actor in 1988. Roshan is a very family oriented and a strong Buddhist. He had two older brothers: Kapila, Chathura and one older sister, Thrishara. He has referred to his family many times in public and always talks about how he has a great family.

Pilapitiya was dated to popular actress Chathurika Pieris since 2001 where they later separated in 2013. In 2017, he married Ridma Perera, and the couple has one son, Rahul.

Career
During 1987–1989 JVP insurrection period, he worked in a musical band. His career was started with Lester James Peries' teledrama Golu Hadawatha. At the start he was also a singer who performed in the band Red Heart, performed as a guitarist, keyboard player and also as a singer. His debut film was an English film called Disco Girl in 1990. Pilapitiya lead the role of remake of film Hatharadenaama Soorayo in 2008, which was originally led by Vijaya Kumaratunga.

Pilapitya made his acting debut with teledrama Golu Hadawatha (1988), which was directed by popular director Lester James Peries. He won a Presidential award for best upcoming actor in 2002. He played the main part of several commercial successes such as Mandakini (1999), Daru Upatha (2001), Rajjumala (2004), Dhana Rina (2007) and critically acclaimed act in teledramas such as Ek Murgaanganaawiyak.

Notable television serials

 Golu Hadawatha (1988)
 Mandakini (1999)
 Neela Pabulu (2018–present)
 Ek Murgaanganaawiyak (1999)
 Gini Dalu Meda (1999)
 Magi (2000)
 Mahagedara (2000)
 Weda Mahaththaya (2000)
 Daruwange Ammala (2000)
 Dath Kekulu Pala (2000)
 Magi (2000)
 Hemanthaye Wasanthayak (2001)
 Daru Upatha (2001)
 Nisala Diya Sasala Viya (2001)
 Diya Sewaneli (2001)
 Ambu Daruwo (2001)
 Sooriya Daruwo (2002)
 Indrachapa (2005)
 Issaraha Gedara (2002)
 Visi Ekwana Horawa (2002)
 Monara Kirilli (2002)
 Suwanda Obai Amme (2003)
 Sandawathaka Waruna (2003)
 Samanala Gamanak (2003)
 Sathyaya (2003)
 Diya Sithuvam (2004)
 Wasanthaya Awilla (2004)
 Rajjumala (2004)
 Rangana Vijithaya (2004)
 Samanala Gamana (2004)
 Sanda Hiru Tharu (2004)
 Vasanthaya Avilla (2004)
 Rankira Soya (2004)
 Sandali Saha Radika (2006)
 Sujatha (2006)
 Heeye Manaya (2006)
 Pethi Ahulana Mala (2006)
 Dhana Rina (2007)
 Surangana Duwa (2007)
 Man Hinda (2007)
 Satharadenek Senpathiyo (2007)
 Dewana Maw (2007)
 Kampitha Vill (2008)
 Karuwala Gedara (2008)
 Diya Sithuwam (2008)
 Isuru Yogaya (2006)
 Dakina Dakina Mal
 Sihina Kumari (2009)
 Sulang Kapolla (2010)
 Prarthana Mal (2010)
 Me Sonduru Piyapath (2010)
 Sihina Aran Enna (2010)
 Prarthana (2011)
 Isuru Sangramaya (2011)
 Doowaru (2012)
 Isuru Sangramaya (2012)
 Nirsathwayo (2013)
 Sasara Sarani (2014)
 Raena (2014) 
 Daskon (2015)
 Devi (2016)
 Me Mamai (2016)
 Salsapuna (2016–2018)
 Sooriya Nayo (2017)
 Thawa Durai Jeewithe (2017)
 Sidu (2016–2018)
 Kotipathiyo (2018)
 Raahu (2018)
 Idora Wassa (2018)
 Amuthu Rasikaya (2019)
 Ran Bedi Minissu (2019)
 Sanda Nati Reya (TBD)
 Sanda Vimana (TBD)
 Susumaka Ima (2019)
 Click (2019)
 Ahas Maliga (2019)
 Nenala (2020)<ref>{{cite web |url=http://www.sarasaviya.lk/teledramas/2020/09/24/19033/නාලන්ගේ-නෑනලා-රූපවාහිනියට-එති |title=Nalan's 'Nenala come on TV |publisher=Sarasaviya |access-date=24 September 2017}}</ref>
 Paara Dige (2021)
 Api Apa Athara (2021)
 Ves Gaththo (2021)
 Kunchanadha'' (TBD)

Songs
Following list is the songs of Roshan Pilapitiya.

 Mage Nisala Lowe 
 Sahasak Sithuwili 
 Soduru Pem Kathawak 
 Soduru Sedewaka 
 Atheethayata Yana Pare 
 Bidunu Premaya 
 Matath Hora Mage Nethu Laga 
 Hamuwee Wenwi Giyath 
 Nonimi Pemaka Petali  
 Paasal Samaye Dutu.
 Hitha Parala
 Dakinna Awe

Awards
 Best Upcoming Actor in Sumathi Awards – 2000
 Dharmaraja Abhinandana Award – 2001
 Best Upcoming Actor in Sarasaviya Awards – 2002
 Best Upcoming Actor in Presidential Awards – 2002
 Most Popular Actor in Sumathi Awards – 2003
 Most Popular Actor in Sumathi Awards – 2004
 Best Actor in Sumathi Awards – 2005

Filmography

References

External links
 https://www.facebook.com/public/Roshan-Pilapitiya
 http://www.english.gossiplankanews.com/2013/05/roshan-pilapitiya-left-all-alone-in.html
 http://www.films.lk/ArtistDetails.php?id=283
 http://infolanka.com/org/srilanka/enter/19.htm
 රොෂාන්ගේ FACE BOOK පිටුව HACK කරලා
 A comedy play at New Townhall
 Political comedy in Ja-ela

Living people
1975 births
Sri Lankan male television actors
Sinhalese male actors
Sri Lankan male film actors
Alumni of Dharmaraja College